Ludwig Bachhofer (June 30, 1894 – March 1976) was a German art historian and professor in Munich and at the University of Chicago.

Life 
Bachhofer began his studies in 1916 at the University of Munich, but had to interrupt this due to the First World War. In 1918 he resumed his studies and received his doctorate in 1921 with a dissertation on the art of Japanese woodcut masters.

In 1921/22 Bachhofer completed a scientific training at the Museum of Ethnology in Munich under Lucian Scherman. In 1926 he helped to establish the Department of Japanese Art of the Ethnological Museum in Munich. In 1926 he was in Munich in art history and Asian archeology and worked as a private lecturer at the University of Munich. He held lectures on Chinese, Japanese and Indian art history.

In July 1933, he was appointed associate professor, but the responsible ministry disagreed with the nomination because of the "non-Aryan origin" of Bachhofer's wife. Since Bachhofer refused a divorce from his wife of Jewish origin [3] and he was threatened with dismissal, the family emigrated in 1934 to the United States.

From 1935 Bachhofer worked as a professor of East Asian art history at the University of Chicago, and from 1941 as a full professor. From 1941 to 1945 he was also co-editor of the Art Bulletin. In 1965 he retired.

Research 
Bachhofer's research interests included East Asian art, with a focus on the history of art in Central Asia and its connection with India, Iran and China. In Germany, he was one of the most important experts of the new discipline of Asian art history.[1] His work on the early Indian sculpture has long been considered a standard work. [1]

Works 

 Chinese art. Wroclaw 1923
 The early Indian sculpture. 2 volumes, Munich / Florence 1929
 A Short History of Chinese Art. Pantheon, New York 1946

Literature 

 Harrie Vanderstappen: "Ludwig Bachhofer (1894–1976)". In: Hartmut Walravens: Bibliographies on the East Asian art history of Germany. 1983

References

1894 births
1976 deaths
German art historians
German emigrants to the United States
University of Chicago faculty